Fractured Minds  is a puzzle role-playing video game developed by British game designer Emily Mitchell and published by Wired Productions for PlayStation 4, Xbox One, Microsoft Windows, iOS, and Nintendo Switch. It was released worldwide in November 14, 2017. Mitchell won a 2017 British Academy of Film and Television Arts (BAFTA) Award for Game Making for Fractured Minds.

The Academy described Fractured Minds as an "immersive puzzle game" which gives players "genuine insight into the experiences of those [...] living with mental illness -- the feelings of isolation, of being trapped, [and] of everyday situations being distorted beyond recognition". 80% of the proceeds from the sale of Fractured Mind go to Safe In Our World, a charitable group in the video games industry that supports World Mental Health Day and provides other services for those living with mental health complications.

Gameplay 

Players take control of a nameless protagonist and progress through six bleak atmospheric chapters, each of which represent a different challenge associated with mental illness, such as isolation, paranoia, and anxiety.
 Though the experiences portrayed in the game are loosely inspired by real life day-to-day occurrences, the viewpoint character's mental health issues render them disturbing and distorted beyond recognition. The viewpoint character progresses through a personal and emotional journey until the resolution of the game.

Development 

Emily Mitchell, a British programmer from Watford, United Kingdom developed the game on her own at the age of 17.  She states that the game was inspired by her own battles with anxiety and that her goal was to create a genuine experience that would help more people empathize with those struggling with mental health issues. The game was later picked up for distribution by Wired Productions, a game publishing firm also based in Watford.

The game's soundtrack was provided by Russian composer Kai Engel.

Reception 

Critical Hit magazine hailed the game as a "concentrated, clever exploration of life with mental illness".
 Though noting its 'just starting out with game dev' aesthetic, the review praised the game's unnerving atmosphere and deep meaning, comparing it to the psychological horror film The Babadook.

The British Academy of Fine Arts (BAFTA) praised the game as well, honoring it with its 2017 award for game making. BAFTA described it as an "immersive puzzle game" which gives players "genuine insight into the experiences of those [...] living with mental illness—the feelings of isolation, of being trapped, [and] of everyday situations being distorted beyond recognition.

References 

Dystopian video games
Single-player video games
PlayStation 4 games
Xbox Cloud Gaming games
Xbox One games
Windows games
Android (operating system) games
2017 video games
Role-playing video games
Puzzle video games
Simulation video games
Video games about mental health
Video games developed in the United Kingdom
2017 software
Wired Productions games